Benjamin Philpot,  MA (b Laxfield 9 January 1790 – d Surbiton 28 May 1889) was Archdeacon of Man from 22 May 1832 until 25 June 1839.

Philpot was educated at Christ's College, Cambridge. He held incumbencies in Walpole, Kirk Andreas, Great Cressingham, Lydney and Dennington.
edited by John Peile

Notes

1790 births
Clergy from Suffolk
1889 deaths
Alumni of Christ's College, Cambridge
Archdeacons of Man
19th-century Manx Anglican priests
19th-century English Anglican priests